Appalachian State University (Appalachian, App State, App, or ASU) is a public university in Boone, North Carolina. It was founded as a teachers college in 1899 by brothers B. B. and D. D. Dougherty and the latter's wife, Lillie Shull Dougherty. The university expanded to include other programs in 1967 and joined the University of North Carolina System in 1971.

The university enrolls more than 20,600 students. It offers more than 150 bachelor's degrees and 70 graduate degree programs, including two doctoral programs. The university has 8 colleges: the College of Arts and Sciences, the Walker College of Business, the Reich College of Education, the College of Fine and Applied Arts, the Beaver College of Health Sciences, the Honors College, the Hayes School of Music, and University College. In addition to its campus in Boone, it will open an additional campus in Hickory, North Carolina in Fall 2023.

The Athletic Teams compete in the Sun Belt Conference, except for a few sports which compete in the Southern Conference, such as wrestling. The teams are known as the Mountaineers.

History

Appalachian State University began in 1899 when a group of residents in Watauga County, under the leadership of Blanford B. Dougherty and his brother Dauphin D. Dougherty, began a movement to educate teachers in northwestern North Carolina. Land was donated by Daniel B. Dougherty, father of the leaders in the enterprise, and by J. F. Hardin. On this site a wood-frame building, costing $1,000, was erected by contributions from citizens of the town and county. In the fall of 1899, the Dougherty brothers, acting as co-principals, began the school, which was then called Watauga Academy. The first year saw 53 students enrolled in three grades. D. D. Dougherty's wife, Lillie Shull Dougherty, taught classes and contributed to administrative decisions.

In 1903, after interest in the school had spread to adjoining counties, D. D. Doughterty was convinced the state would fund institutions established to train teachers. He traveled to the state capital, Raleigh, after drafting a bill. W. C. Newland of Caldwell County introduced the bill in the North Carolina Legislature to make this a state school, with an appropriation for maintenance and for building. Captain E. F. Lovill of Watauga County, R. B. White of Franklin County, Clyde Hoey of Cleveland County and E. J. Justice of McDowell County spoke in favor of the measure. On March 9, 1903, the bill became law, and the Appalachian Training School for Teachers was established. The school opened on October 5, 1903, with $2,000 from the state and 325 students.

For 22 years, there was a period of steady growth, academic development, and valuable service to the state. In 1925, the legislature changed the name to the Appalachian State Normal School and appropriated additional funding for maintenance and permanent improvement. Four years later, in 1929, the school became a four-year degree granting institution and was renamed Appalachian State Teachers College. Over 1,300 students were enrolled in degree programs offered for primary grades education, physical education, math, English, science, and history.

Appalachian attained national standards by becoming accredited by the American Association for Teacher Education in 1939, and the Southern Association of Colleges and Schools in 1942. In 1948 a Graduate School was formed. Dr. Dougherty retired in 1955, after 56 years of serving the school. J. D. Rankin became interim president until Dr. William H. Plemmons was installed. Plemmons lead from 1955 to 1969, and his administration oversaw the addition of new buildings as the campus expanded and enrollment grew to nearly 5,000 students.

Appalachian was transformed from a single-purpose teachers' college into a multipurpose regional university and Appalachian State Teacher's College became Appalachian State University in 1967. Growth continued in the 1970s to around 9,500 students and 550 faculty. Afterward, four degree granting undergraduate colleges were created: Arts and Sciences, Business, Fine and Applied Arts, and Education. Dr. Herbert Wey succeeded Plemmons as president in 1969 and was named chancellor in 1971. In 1972, Appalachian State became part of the University of North Carolina system.

Campus

 
The university's main campus is in downtown Boone, a town of 19,092 compared to an ASU enrollment of 19,108 students.

The center of campus is nicknamed Sanford Mall, an open grassy quad between the student union, dining halls, and library. Sanford Hall, located on the mall's edge, is named for Terry Sanford, a former governor of the state. Rivers Street, a thoroughfare for town and university traffic, essentially divides the campus into east and west sections with tunnels and a pedestrian bridge connecting the two halves. The eastern half includes Sanford Mall, Plemmons Student Union, Roess Dining Hall (formerly known as Central Dining Hall), and Belk Library, along with two communities of residence halls. The west side has Trivette Dining Hall, the Student Recreation Center (or SRC), the Quinn Recreation Center, Kidd Brewer Stadium, and Stadium Heights and Yosef Hollow, the two remaining residence hall communities. At the north end, Bodenheimer Drive crosses over Rivers Street and leads to Appalachian Heights (an apartment-style residence hall), Mountaineer Hall, the Chancellor's House, the Living Learning Center, and Jim and Bettie Smith Stadium. The George M. Holmes Convocation Center at the south end of Rivers Street is the gateway and entrance to campus.

Turchin Center for the Visual Arts
The Turchin Center for the Visual Arts on the edge of main campus is the university's visual art center. The Turchin Center is the largest visual arts center in northwestern North Carolina, eastern Tennessee, and southwestern Virginia. It displays rotating exhibits indoors and outdoors, some exhibits being culturally specific to the Appalachians, and offers community outreach programs through art courses. The center was opened by Appalachian State in 2003. The newly renovated Schaefer Center for the Performing Arts, a 1,635 seat performance venue, hosts artists from around the world.

Appalachian State University Preserve
The Appalachian State University Nature Preserve consists of 67 acres of protected woodlands located by the heart of campus. The land was dedicated as a State Natural Area in 1999 through the North Carolina Nature Preserves Act, and serves as an outdoor classroom for students and faculty. The primary purposes of the preserve are to enable conservation, education and recreation for students, staff, and faculty.

Administration
The University of North Carolina's Board of Governors plans and develops the coordinated system of higher education within the state. They set university policy but delegate Appalachian State's daily operations to a chancellor. The chancellor likewise delegates some duties to the provost, several vice-chancellors, and other administrative offices. These administrative offices are advised by several university committees on the needs of campus constituents, as represented by a Faculty Senate, Staff Senate, Graduate Student Association Senate, and the Student Government Association.

Presidents
 B. B. Dougherty (1899–1955)
 J. D. Rankin (1955, Interim)
 William H. Plemmons (1955–1969)
 Herbert Wey (1969–1971)

Chancellors
 Herbert Wey (1971–1979)
 Cratis Williams (1975, Acting)
 John E. Thomas (1979–1993)
 Francis T. Borkowski (1993–2003)
 Provost Harvey Durham (2003–2004, Interim)
 Kenneth E. Peacock (2004–2014)
 Sheri Everts (2014–present)

Academics

Rankings and recognition

Library

In 2005, the Carol Grotnes Belk Library & Information Commons opened in a new  five-story building. Belk Library holds over 1.871 million bound books and periodicals, 1.5 million microforms, 24,000 sound recordings, and 14,000 videos. The Library holds varying collections, including the W.L Eury Appalachian Collection for regional studies and the Stock Car Racing Collection. With the opening of the new library building in 2005, Bill and Maureen Rhinehart of Long Island, New York, donated a large collection of rare books in English history, spanning from the 16th to the 19th centuries. The university created a special collections room for this valuable donation which includes some 900 volumes comprising nearly 450 titles. The entire collection was published in two volumes of an annotated bibliography, comprised by retired English professor Dr. M. John Higby. Both volumes comprise almost 240 pages and are excellent in both scholarship and thoroughness. It was the last major endeavor of his career in education. The library is also home to an impressive stock car racing collection including a donation from the family of Richard "The King" Petty. Besides serving university patrons, the library also serves the local community with circulation available to registered patrons.

Colleges
Appalachian State offers 176 undergraduate and 42 graduate majors. The average GPA for incoming freshmen in 2017 was 4.20. Courses at Appalachian are organized into seven colleges and one graduate school:
College of Arts and Sciences
College of Fine and Applied Arts
Beaver College of Health Sciences
Hayes School of Music
The Honors College
Reich College of Education
Walker College of Business
Cratis D. Williams School of Graduate Studies

Watauga Residential College

Watauga Residential College (formerly Watauga Global Community) is a residential college founded in 1972. Watauga College was founded to be an "interdisciplinary, experimental, residential, coed alternative for social science and humanities general education requirements."  Watauga Residential College was developed as "response to rising criticism of American education during the sixties and to the artificial fragmentation of knowledge in the academy; it was seen as a return to the world, where problems and themes do not recognize disciplinary boundaries and education is reconnected with individual learners."

Although it has changed names over the years, Watauga College in 1972, Watauga Global Community in 2008, and Watauga Residential College in 2014, its mission has remained relatively the same. "Watauga Residential College pursues its mission through a sequenced, interdisciplinary, experiential curriculum that requires students to integrate class content, community-based research, and multicultural immersion. This innovative curriculum, in conjunction with the academic and residential community, creates an atmosphere for the emergence of dynamic learning experiences through unique interactions among students and faculty."  A key focus of Watauga is on the residential community so for the first year students are required to live in the living learning center.

Watauga College was first based in Watauga Hall, then for decades was based in East Hall, a large U-shaped dormitory on the east end of Campus. The dorm was known campus-wide as having the largest rooms of any dorm on the Appalachian campus, yet it was one of the oldest dorms on campus. Upon the completion of the Living Learning Center in 2003, Watauga College relocated and East Hall will either be renovated or destroyed because of the high cost of renovating such an old building.

Off-campus centers
Appalachian State University offers off-campus courses through three off-campus centers and online. These centers are:
 The ASU Center at Hickory
 The ASU Center at Burke in Morganton
 The ASU Center at Caldwell in Hudson
Off-campus programs offer students the ability to maintain family and careers while working toward a degree. Full-time undergraduate programs are available in Elementary Education, Advertising, Criminal Justice, Management, Social Work and Psychology. Appalachian provides a variety of off-campus, part-time undergraduate and graduate programs.

Publications
The history department of ASU publishes History Matters: An Undergraduate Journal of Historical Research, an undergraduate research journal. It was established in 2003 by Eric Burnnette, an ASU undergraduate student of history. The journal accepts submissions from all undergraduates nationwide and internationally, with special attention to papers that utilize primary sources. The editorial board consists of undergraduate and faculty advisors at ASU.

Members of the ASU Department of Physics and Astronomy serve as editors for the journal The Physics Teacher.

The university publishes or holds copyrights to several other periodicals, including:
IMPULSE: The Premier Undergraduate Neuroscience Journal, Department of Psychology, College of Arts and Sciences
Appalachian Business Review, Bureau of Business and Economic Research, Walker College of Business
Appalachian Journal, Center for Appalachian Studies, College of Arts and Sciences
Appalachian Today, University magazine
Cold Mountain Review, Department of English
The International Comet Quarterly, Department of Physics and Astronomy (ceded to the Smithsonian Astrophysical Observatory in 1990)
Journal of Developmental Education, Center for Developmental Education, Reich College of Education
Journal of Health Care Marketing, Center for Management Development, Walker College of Business
The Appalachian, student newspaper
The Peel Literature & Arts Review, yearly student arts publication

Centers and institutes
The university houses several academic centers and institutes related to its mission. These include:
 Adult Basic Skills Professional Development Project
 Appalachian Energy Center – Includes the following:
Collaborative Biodiesel Project
Renewable Energy Initiative
Small Wind R&D Site
Center for Appalachian Studies – Includes the Appalachian Collection held by Belk Library, the Appalachian Cultural Museum, and publishing editor of the Appalachian Journal
Center for Entrepreneurship
Center for Judaic, Holocaust, & Peace Studies
Center for Management Development
Goodnight Family Sustainable Development Program
Institute for Health and Human Services
Math and Science Education Center
National Center for Developmental Education and the Kellogg Institute
The Human Performance Lab at the North Carolina Research Campus
Henderson Springs LGBTQ+ Center - located in Plemmons Student Union on the first floor.
Women's Center - located in Plemmons Student Union on the first floor.
Multicultural Center - located in Plemmons Student Union.

Student life

Students at ASU enjoy a variety of outdoor activities. The mountains offer snowboarding, skiing, tubing, rock climbing, hiking, rafting, camping, and fishing on and around the Blue Ridge Parkway. ASU also has over 400 clubs and organizations run by the McCaskey Center for Student Involvement and Leadership, such as Greek organizations, academic and diversity clubs, and sports clubs. Before the start of every semester, the university hosts a 'Club Expo' featuring all the clubs and organizations on campus. This event is for students to find an organization or club that suits them and to become involved. The university also has volunteer centers including the Multicultural Center, the LGBT Center, and the Women's Center (which is the only completely volunteer-run Women's Center in the state of North Carolina). All three centers are under the supervision of the Multicultural Student Development Office. On November 11, 2016, ASU opened a fourth center in their student union; the Student Veterans Resource Center. The campus also sports 3 indoor fitness facilities as well as an athletics field and an outdoor recreation center.

The Appalachian Popular Programming Society (A.P.P.S.) is a university funded organization that exists to plan and provide diverse educational, enriching, and entertaining events for the community and student body of Appalachian State. Through its seven programming councils, A.P.P.S. members select, plan, promote, and present a diverse variety of popular entertainment programs and films which enhance the social and cultural life for Appalachian students. A.P.P.S. was founded in 1985 to help with the student nightlife and to support retention. APPS plays a vital role in fostering and developing an inclusive Appalachian State University community. The seven councils of A.P.P.S. include Heritage, Club Shows, Main Stage, Representation and Intentional Student Engagement (RISE), Films, Special Events, and Spirit & Traditions. Students can enjoy concerts and other miscellaneous events at Legends, an entertainment facility located on campus. ASU also offers an in-house movie theater within Plemmons Student Union, Greenbriar Theater, where students can go to watch movies.

Sustainability

Appalachian has invested in several sustainability projects in recent years such as:

 A  wind turbine was installed at the Broyhill Inn and Conference Center in 2008. The wind turbine has become the most visible symbol of Appalachian's projects in renewable energy.
Both Frank Residence Hall, renovated in 2009, and The Mountaineer Residence Hall erected in 2011 have LEED® Gold Certifications. and received a total of 68 points based on its energy saving and sustainability features. 65 points are needed to receive gold certification. Mountaineer Residence Hall houses a 40-panel solar thermal system to provide hot water needs. Buildings on ASU's campus that utilize solar energy include the Varsity Gym, Plemmons Student Union, Raley Hall, and Kerr Scott Hall. Kerr Scott Hall also has the first green roof on campus. The green roof works to conserve energy by providing shade and removing heat from the air through evapotranspiration. 
Appalachian Food Services is working to reduce food waste on campus by sending pre- and post-consumer food waste to a composting facility whose compost is used by Appalachian's Landscape Services as fertilizers.
The AppalCART is a no-cost public transit service that services the campus and surrounding Boone community.
Solar trash compactors were installed around Sanford mall in 2010. The trash compactors run 100% on solar power, and are completely self powered. 
Outside of the Living Learning Center sits The Edible Schoolyard which is a community space where students, faculty, and staff can maintain a garden plot to learn gardening practices. At this garden space, small-scale farming and gardening principles are pursued in an effort to teach productive maintenance of agricultural ecosystems, self-sufficiency, and permaculture. 
The Environment-Economy-Ecology, or the E3, house sits outside of the John E. Thomas Building on Campus. The E3 house was built by students in the building science and appropriate technology programs at Appalachian State University. The ASU Renewable Energy Initiative allocated $30,000 towards the photovoltaic (PV) rooftop array. The  house is used to test new technologies in building practices. Unlike most compact and transportable shelters, the structure is designed to be self-sufficient and adaptable to a variety of environmental and cultural situations. The design incorporates a blend of structural insulated panels for assembly speed and strength, combined with local construction techniques to create an energy-efficient envelope. It can accommodate up to five occupants. The building's energy-efficient features include use of structural insulated panels (SIPs) for the building's exterior walls and roof. The panels have an insulation R-value of 30, compared to R-19 in typical home construction. The building also has solar panels, which generate energy needs for the occupants, a system to collect rainwater from the roof, and low-flow plumbing fixtures.
We Are Still In (2018)- Over 3,500 organizations, representative of the United States' economy and society, are showing the world that we stand by the Paris Climate Agreement and are committed to meeting its goals.
Tree Campus USA certification- Appalachian State University has received Tree Campus USA certification from the Arbor Day Foundation. The certification process was a collaborative effort between the Department of Biology, Department of Geography and Planning, Physical Plant and New River Light and Power. "This certification demonstrates Appalachian's commitment to environmental aspects of sustainability,"
American Campuses Act on Climate Roundtable invited participant (2015)- Appalachian State University was one of 38 institutions of higher learning invited to participate in the American Campuses Act on Climate Roundtable Nov. 19 at the Eisenhower Executive Office Building in Washington, D.C. The event was hosted by the White House Council on Environmental Quality.
Climate Leadership Award- In October 2015, the university was a recipient of Second Nature and the USGBC's Climate Leadership Award, which recognized Appalachian's commitment to climate action.
Climate Pledge- In addition, Chancellor Everts visited the White House for the Day of Climate Action and signed the American Campuses Act on Climate Pledge. Chancellor Everts also signed the newly revamped Second Nature Climate Commitment.
Received Carolina Recycling Association award- Appalachian State University's composting program has received the Outstanding Composting or Organics Program Award from the Carolina Recycling Association.

Athletics

Appalachian's sports teams are nicknamed the Mountaineers. The Mountaineers compete in NCAA Division I and are members of the Sun Belt Conference. Appalachian fields varsity teams in 17 sports, 7 for men and 10 for women. The Mountaineer football team started competing in the NCAA Football Bowl Subdivision (FBS) in the 2014–2015 academic year. 

Kidd Brewer Stadium is the 30,000-seat home of Appalachian football. In 2017, App State added a new video board, sound system and LED ribbon displays. Kidd Brewer Stadium also offers additional stadium seating with 18 luxury suites, 600 club seats, and the Chancellor's Box areas that offer a great view of the field and campus.

The George M. Holmes Convocation Center is the home court for Appalachian's basketball teams. The  arena, with seating for 8,325, is also the home for volleyball and indoor track and field. In 2017, a new Daktronics video board was installed. The board is made up of nine displays totaling a square footage of 1,200.

University Recreation (UREC) also offers 20 club sports that compete with other regional institutions on a non-varsity level: lacrosse (men's and women's), rugby (men's and women's), soccer (men's and women's), ultimate frisbee (men's and women's), volleyball (men's and women's), climbing, cycling, equestrian, fencing, ice hockey, skiing, racquetball, snowboarding, swimming, and triathlon.

The university's cycling team has had success at the regional and national level; they compete within the Atlantic Collegiate Cycling Conference. The team competes in every discipline of bicycle racing that is acknowledged by National Collegiate Cycling Association within USA Cycling. This includes road bicycle racing, Mountain bike racing and Cyclocross. The team won the Division 2, as established by USA Cycling, collegiate team mountain bike national championships in 2008. They won the Division 2 collegiate team cyclocross national championships in 2008 and 2009. The team is now recognized as a Division 1 team.

On February 19, 2011, the Appalachian State Mountaineer women's basketball team won the 2011 Southern Conference regular-season title. The last time they had won the title was 1996. This is a first for Head Coach Darcie Vincent. On May 18, 2012, the Appalachian State baseball team beat Western Carolina University, becoming Southern Conference baseball champions for the first time since 1985.

Football

Appalachian won three consecutive Division I FCS (I-AA) national championships in 2005, 2006, and 2007, over the University of Northern Iowa, the University of Massachusetts, and the University of Delaware, respectively. The Mountaineers are the first FCS football team to win three straight national championships since the playoffs began in 1978. They are also the first Division I program to win three consecutive national championships since Army accomplished the feat in 1944, 1945, and 1946.

In a milestone for ASU athletics, on September 1, 2007, the Appalachian State football team played their season opener at the fifth-ranked University of Michigan in front of the largest crowd to ever witness an ASU football game. Appalachian State beat Michigan in the game that would become known as the "Alltime Upset" by Sports Illustrated with a final score of 34–32 and became the first Division I FCS (I-AA) football team to defeat a Division I FBS (I-A) team ranked in the AP poll.

Appalachian State moved to the FBS subdivision in 2014, finishing its first season with a winning record but ineligible for a bowl bid per NCAA rules. Each season from 2015 to 2019, App State won both its conference championship and final bowl game. In 2020, although the Mountaineers did not win the Sun Belt Conference, they did win their sixth consecutive bowl game, defeating North Texas 56–28 in the inaugural Myrtle Beach Bowl.

Athletic bands

The Hayes School of Music provides support for the Mountaineers at all home football games with the Marching Mountaineers, and at all home basketball games with the Appalachian Pep Band. The Marching Mountaineers travel to a select few away games each football season. The director of the athletic bands is Dr. Jason P. Gardner. In addition to supporting the athletic department, the Marching Mountaineers have assisted the Rho Tau chapter of Phi Mu Alpha Sinfonia in hosting the Appalachian Marching Band Festival annually. The festival has been on hiatus since 2019 due to stadium construction and the COVID-19 pandemic.

In media
In 2004, a committee for the Appalachian Family Caravan tour created a promotional video titled "Hot Hot Hot", shown throughout the area by Chancellor Kenneth E. Peacock. The video became an inadvertent internet phenomenon and was featured on VH1's Web Junk 20 program in early 2006. The video was never intended to promote Appalachian State to anyone but the Family Caravan, much less as a recruiting tool for prospective students. The video is no longer used by the university, due to student and alumni protests.

In 2002, MTV's program Road Rules visited ASU to produce an episode called Campus Crawl, aired on-campus during an annual, winter student swimming event called the "Polar Plunge". The show's participants also crossed a high-wire strung between Coltrane and Gardner Halls.

On March 16, 2012, Appalachian State placed a tenured sociology professor on administrative leave for a variety of charges, which included showing an anti-pornography documentary, The Price of Pleasure. This move gained national attention from the academic community.

Notable alumni

Academia 
 BJ Casey – psychologist, expert on adolescent brain development and self-control
 Robert Allen Phillips – known for work on stakeholder theory and organizational ethics
 Laura Wright – founder of academic field of Vegan Studies

Arts and entertainment 
 Eric Bachmann – musician and producer; principal member of groups Crooked Fingers and Archers of Loaf
 Carlton Bost – musician, composer, producer; member of groups Berlin, Deadsy, Orgy, and Stabbing Westward
 Eric Church – country music singer
 Luke Combs – country music singer 
 Eustace Conway – naturalist, focus of book The Last American Man, one of subjects featured in History Channel series Mountain Men
 Charles Frazier – novelist, author of Cold Mountain
 Michael Gregory – of The Gregory Brothers and creator of Auto-tune the News series.
 Byron Hill – country and pop music songwriter
 Andrew Hubner – novelist
 Lisa Lynn Masters – actress
 Kate Rhudy – singer, songwriter, and musician
 Jason Roberts – guitarist known for collaborations with Norah Jones
 Douglas Sarine – co-creator of Ask a Ninja
 Mary Ellen Snodgrass – author, two-time New York Public Library award winner
 Whitney Thore – TV personality 
 Gary Wheeler – film director and producer
 Gene Wooten – Nashville Dobro player and session musician
 Michael Alvarado – member of American folk pop group Us the Duo

Athletics 
 Sam Adams  – professional golfer who played on the PGA Tour
 Jane Albright – women's college basketball head coach
 Jennifer E. Alley – former North Carolina Tar Heels women's basketball head coach
 Isaac Anderson – Olympic wrestler (1988 Summer Olympics)
 Travaris Cadet – NFL running back
 Don Cardwell – MLB pitcher, 1969 World Series champion
 Dexter Coakley – NFL linebacker (Dallas Cowboys and St. Louis Rams), member of the College Football Hall of Fame
 Jaylin Davis – MLB player for the San Francisco Giants
 Armanti Edwards – NFL and CFL wide receiver; played quarterback at App State, led team to two NCAA FCS national championships
 Ryan Ellis – NASCAR Cup Series driver
 Darrynton Evans – NFL running back
 Ashley Fliehr, better known as Charlotte Flair – WWE professional wrestler (transferred to North Carolina State University)
 Ed Gainey – CFL defensive back
 Alvin Gentry – former NBA head coach of Miami Heat, Detroit Pistons, Los Angeles Clippers, Phoenix Suns, and New Orleans Pelicans
 Tony Gravely – UFC fighter 
 Dino Hackett – NFL linebacker (Kansas City Chiefs)
 Mary Jayne Harrelson – track athlete, two-time NCAA Division I Women's Outdoor 1500m National Champion
 Ron Hodges – MLB catcher
 Jason Hunter – NFL defensive end (Denver Broncos)
 Dexter Jackson – NFL wide receiver (Carolina Panthers)
 Shemar Jean-Charles – NFL cornerback
 Daniel Jeremiah – analyst for NFL Network, writer with NFL.com, host of Move the Sticks podcast
 Paul Johnson – college football head coach
 Daniel Kilgore – NFL center (San Francisco 49ers)
 Corey Lynch – NFL safety (Tampa Bay Buccaneers)
 Rico Mack – NFL linebacker
Sam Martin – NFL punter (Denver Broncos)
 Demetrius McCray – NFL cornerback (Jacksonville Jaguars)
 Doug Middleton – NFL safety (New York Jets)
 Melissa Morrison-Howard – two-time Olympic hurdler bronze medalist (2000 & 2004)
 Marques Murrell – NFL linebacker (New York Jets)
 Tyson Patterson – professional basketball player
 Ron Prince – NFL assistant coach Detroit Lions, former head coach at Kansas State University
 Mike Ramsey – MLB infielder from 1978 to 1985
 Mark Royals – NFL punter from 1987 to 2003
 Brian Quick – NFL wide receiver (Washington Redskins, St. Louis Rams)
 Scott Satterfield – former App State Head Football Coach; current Head Football Coach at Louisville University
 John Settle – NFL running back, served as NFL and college running backs coach 
 Belus Smawley – basketball pioneer, one of the first basketball players to regularly use the jump shot
 Jeffrey Springs – MLB pitcher
 Matt Stevens – NFL safety
 D. J. Thompson – professional basketball player
 Coaker Triplett – MLB outfielder for Cubs, Cardinals, and Phillies from 1938 to 1945
 Daniel Wilcox – NFL tight end (Baltimore Ravens)
 Steve Wilks – NFL head coach
 Everett Withers – football head coach of Texas State Bobcats, former head coach of James Madison Dukes and University of North Carolina at Chapel Hill

Business 
 James Edgar Broyhill – founder of Broyhill Furniture Industries, Inc.
 Chuck Gallagher – entrepreneur, speaker and author
 Harry L. Williams – president and CEO of the Thurgood Marshall College Fund

Economics and finance 
 Stephen J. Dubner – writer, co-author of Freakonomics
 Chris Swecker – Head of Corporate Security for Bank of America and former assistant director, FBI

Government and law 
 Lt. Gen. Robert P. Ashley – 19th Director of the U.S. Defense Intelligence Agency
 Chad Barefoot – former North Carolina state Senator who represented the 18th district from 2013 to 2018
 Ted Budd – member of U.S. House of Representatives from North Carolina's 13th district
 Javiera Caballero – Member of the Durham City Council
 Howard Coble – former Republican 6th district U.S. Congressman from Greensboro, North Carolina (only attended Appalachian for one year)
 Kevin Corbin - State Senator, North Carolina 
 Morris "Moe" Davis – United States Air Force officer, lawyer, and administrative law judge who is running as a Democrat for Congress in North Carolina's 11th Congressional District. Davis was appointed the third Chief Prosecutor of the Guantanamo military commissions, where he served from September 2005 until October 2007, when he resigned his post over objections over use of waterboarding for obtaining evidence.
 Danya Dayson – Associate Judge on the Superior Court of the District of Columbia
 Josh Dobson – former North Carolina House representing 85th district, current North Carolina Commissioner of Labor
 Andy Dulin – North Carolina House representing 104th district
Larken Egleston - Charlotte, North Carolina City Councilmember
 Destin Hall – North Carolina House representing 87th district
 Allen Joines – 17th Mayor of Winston-Salem, North Carolina
 Brock Long – FEMA administrator
 Chris Swecker, attorney, assistant director of the Federal Bureau of Investigation for the Criminal Investigative Division, has appeared as a guest on CNN, CNBC, and Fox News

Ministry and religion 
 Henry Babers – evangelist and scholar
 Franklin Graham – evangelist and missionary, son of Billy Graham, CEO and president of Samaritan's Purse
 James Emery White – pastor, author, and professor

Science 
 Rachel Harris Larson – chemist and dental researcher who studied the interrelationships of genetics, nutrition, and bacteriology in dental caries
 Ryan Little – surgeon, otorhinolaryngology, rhinologist/endoscopic endonasal skull base surgery at Geisel School of Medicine at Dartmouth College, author
Stanley South – archaeologist, author of Method and Theory in Historical Archaeology

References
Informational notes

Citations

External links

 
 Official athletics website
 Appalachian State University Yearbooks. North Carolina Digital Heritage Center.

 
Educational institutions established in 1899
Universities and colleges accredited by the Southern Association of Colleges and Schools
University of North Carolina
Education in Watauga County, North Carolina
Public universities and colleges in North Carolina
Buildings and structures in Watauga County, North Carolina
1899 establishments in North Carolina
Boone, North Carolina
Universities established in the 1960s